The oboe concerto No.1 in F major, opus 37, is an oboe concerto composed by the Czech composer Franz Krommer.

Structure
The concerto consists of three movements:

Allegro
Adagio
Rondo. Allegro

References

Oboe concertos